Mark Johnson is an American lawyer, politician, and member of the Minnesota Senate. A Republican, Johnson represents parts of Kittson, Marshall, Pennington, Polk, Red Lake, and Roseau counties in northwestern Minnesota. He previously served as acting majority leader of the Minnesota Senate, and now serves as minority leader.

Early life, education, and career
Johnson was raised near Mentor, Minnesota. After graduating from Fertile-Beltrami High School, he received a bachelor's degree from Bethel University and a J.D. degree from the University of North Dakota. Johnson owns a legal firm in East Grand Forks, Minnesota and is a partner in his family's concrete business.

Minnesota Senate
Johnson was elected to the Minnesota Senate in 2016 by a wide margin and reelected in 2020. He succeeded LeRoy Stumpf, who retired after 34 years in the Senate.

Personal life
Johnson and his wife, Skyler, have three children and live in East Grand Forks.

References

External links

 Official Senate website
 Official campaign website

|-

21st-century American politicians
Bethel University (Minnesota) alumni
Businesspeople from Minnesota
Living people
Minnesota lawyers
Republican Party Minnesota state senators
People from Polk County, Minnesota
University of North Dakota alumni
Year of birth missing (living people)